Racial stereotyping in advertising refers to using assumptions about people based on characteristics thought to be typical of their identifying racial group in marketing.

Advertising trends may adopt racially insensitive messages or comply with stereotypes that embrace the values of problematic racial ideologies. Commercials and other forms of media advertisements may be influenced by social stigma regarding race.

Racial stereotypes are mental frameworks that viewers use to process social information based on their cultural, racial, or ethnic group, which may not directly "carry negative or positive values." Advertisers include racial stereotypes in their messaging to target a specific demographic, which can potentially impact viewers negatively through offensive language or concepts. A common rule of thumb for people working in advertising is to "be aware of the potential to cause serious or widespread offense when referring to different races, cultures, nationalities or ethnic groups."

Defining racism in advertising
There is no universal definition of racism or standard for detecting it within the scope of advertisement. Racial tropes are commonly used to target a particular demographic, which tends to lead to insult. The ambiguous nature of defining racism creates a debate about whether it is ethical to use stereotypes in advertisements. Those against racial stereotyping argue that using archetypes as representative of a population is an oversimplification of an entire race of people and further narrows the representation available of marginalized groups. This perspective argues that the media is especially harmful because commercial advertisements are one of the most prevalent and commonplace forms of media. Conversely, others believe that advertisements may use racial stereotypes as long as they do not cause intentional or lasting harm to a population.

Stereotypes are the inferred beliefs of roles, attributes, or positions assigned to different people based on factors like race, religion, sexual orientation, or gender. Advertisers use stereotypes to provide familiarity to a viewer, but pose the risk of generalizing and misrepresenting groups of people to a large audience.

A debate has existed historically around using stereotypes in advertising, but can be simplified by the "mirror" vs. "mold" argument coined by Pollay in 1986. This argument states that advertising "mirrors" society and does not present ideas to viewers that do not already exist as stereotypes. The "mirror" theory argues that advertising reflects the lifestyles and ideals of society and that it is this mirroring effect that drives familiarity with the product or service offered and the subsequent consumer engagement. However, the "mold" argument maintains that advertising influences society, and thus encourages stereotypes because of their ubiquity. The "mold" theory argues that sales are driven by society attempting to conform to the stereotypes and ideas communicated in advertising, as it shapes their own values and beliefs.

Stereotypes in advertising include creating caricatures based upon a perceived notion of a particular group. The limited amount of time given for a commercial advertisement leads to simplified characters who may employ archetypal traits. Audiences use stereotypes to fill in holes in a general character's backstory. Within a thirty-second commercial, advertisers rely on audiences' preconceived notions to understand a character and situation based on the strict prioritization of their time. Stereotypes facilitate a collective but unspoken understanding of the meaning of the commercial, even if the stereotype is damaging to the affiliated group.

Targeting specific demographics 
Racial stereotyping has the potential to reap results for a company if it targets a particular demographic. Audiences have perceptual biases toward people or characters similar to themselves and within their in-group. An in-group consists of people whom individuals socially identify with through similarities in characteristics such as age, race, gender, and religion. Studies have shown that "the enhancement of in-group bias is more related to increased favoritism toward in-group members than increased hostility toward out-group members." Advertisers use this knowledge when targeting a product or service to a particular market and may use demographics to inform the messages they present. Different countries and cultures speak different languages and understand symbols differently, so an advertiser must tactfully account for in-group bias. Viewers are more likely to cast favoritism toward people they can socially identify with. Advertisers, therefore, consider the audience heavily when figuring out how to present their characters. This thought process explains why advertisers use racial stereotyping they may not recognize as offensive.

Advertisers argue that specific demographics can be used to simultaneously employ racial stereotypes and create a successful result for an audience. This argument suggests that a company can achieve successful marketing while creating a message which viewers can identify and connect with. Sociologist Stuart Hall argues that reading a particular image depends not only on the messages contained in it, but on the messages surrounding it and the situational, societal, and historical context. He claims that society constructs stereotypes and it is not a company's responsibility to avoid them.

Whitewashing 
Whitewashing is used in the advertising industry to show a preference for European traits. Whitewashing refers specifically to digitally altering the image of a model to make their appearance fairer. In a TEDx talk, Jean Kilbourne stated that standards of beauty for women are impossible, but especially so for "women of color, who are considered beautiful only insofar as they resemble the white ideal: light skin, straight hair, Caucasian features, round eyes."  Whitewashing is a technique used by advertisers to appeal to a perceived societal ideal.

As an example, in 2008, beauty product company L'Oreal Paris was accused of whitewashing the singer Beyoncé's skin and hair color for their advertising campaign. The accusations suggested that they edited her to be light-complexioned and light-haired in their published images. L'Oreal received tremendous backlash for this incident, namely from the black community. Outraged individuals argued that the altered images diminished the Black community and sent a poor message to Beyoncé's young fans.

Other Black people in the media have experienced whitewashing, such as Lupita Nyong'o for Vanity Fair or Kerry Washington for InStyle. Many companies worry that racial stereotyping and whitewashing could lead to societal consequences, including anger toward the company or discrimination, as demonstrated by companies becoming more careful about their visual and textual choices for product advertising.

Offending marginalized populations 
One of the primary adverse effects of racial stereotyping in marketing is offending the population alluded to in an advertisement.

Researcher Srividya Ramasubramanian discusses how stereotypes become harmful, explaining that there are two stages in the stereotyping process, where activation is more automatic and application is more deliberate. She means essentially that stereotypical thoughts about other groups exist for all people implicitly, even if not acted upon or outwardly expressed. This argument suggests that all people believe in stereotypes to a certain degree, but only become offended when stereotypes are explicitly and openly stated.

Because people naturally identify themselves socially, they assign qualities to themselves that they can also associate with other people. Creating connections within a particular group increases the likelihood of experiencing hurt by stereotypical messaging present in advertisements, which "has a significant impact on the way the individuals within the group self-identify." Therefore, typical outcomes to offensive racial stereotypes are outrage at the producer of the advertisement or self-doubt within the group. Many believe that advertisements' archetypal representations of particular groups are unrealistic and distorted.

Examples of racial stereotyping
Stereotypes directed at people of Asian descent represent well-educated individuals with a high work ethic. Commercials with these stereotypes tend to exist within advertising that promotes technology and business more than other races. Asian people were in ads that take place in the workplace or office setting in 50% of the print ads that they featured in, compared to other races that were featured in more leisure-oriented ads from 2003. Ads that feature Asian American men often perpetuate a stereotype of success and sacrifice to achieve financial rewards, such as Paek and Shah's (2003) example of a print ad, in which an Asian man talking to his wife tells her he will have to work late, implying that his personal life is a secondary commitment to his work. Some argue that the stereotype of hard work and affluence may appear to be a positive one but is actually problematic. Indeed, stereotypes related to the false "Model Minority" discourse have been proven to increase pressure on Asian people to be productive and successful. Television and print advertising shape viewers' perceptions of minorities, and many Asian and Asian-American journalists argue that this representation of Asian people hegemonizes and inaccurately represents a vast and convoluted group.

Stereotypes of Black people common in advertisements are a connection to hip-hop music. Black men in commercials also have exceptional physical and athletic ability, demonstrated by a young man playing basketball in a Kellogg's commercial or the variety of athletes in EA Sport's advertisements for basketball and soccer video games. Similarly, a typical representation for Black women is the "angry black woman" stereotype, where the woman is portrayed as irrational and violent. Other stereotypes may include the hypersexualization and dehumanization of Black people, as demonstrated through an ad by LINGsCARS that received complaints about trivializing the Black Lives Matter movement and stereotyping by playing off the offensive phrase "Once you go black, you never go back." The ad posted on Facebook read "Once you go black, you never go back" and "Black Cars Matter."

Latinx people are drastically underrepresented in the media, featured with speaking roles in only 1% of television ads and in only 4.7% of television ads overall in the early 2000s time period. In a study done by Mastro and Stern (2003) examining frequencies of different races in commercials, Latinx people advertise soap or hygiene products in 43% of ads they are featured in, closely followed by other non-occupational roles promoting clothing or footwear. Ads also more frequently sexualize Latinx populations. Paek and Shah found Latinx populations to participate in advertisements that portrayed subservient and blue-collar labor roles. Additionally, advertisements featuring Latinx people poke fun at accents, implement "Spanglish," and emphasize clichés.

Campaigns against stereotypes 
Some companies make efforts toward being culturally sensitive, but are not received well, such as Pepsi's advertisement featuring Kendall Jenner that was meant to highlight police brutality in the United States. Pepsi and Kendall Jenner both later apologized for the insensitive ad and it was taken down. Common complaints against the ad were that it was "co-opting protest movements for profit" and demonstrated the "white savior" trope in a way that trivialized the movement against police brutality.

An effort that was more positively received by society was the transition of PepsiCo's Aunt Jemima to Pearl Milling Company in 2021. Aunt Jemima was criticized for using stereotypical images and language to represent a Black woman as the "mammy" character. Based on Nancy Green, Aunt Jemima was a stereotypical representation of this woman who created the original recipe and served as the face of the brand for years. Dedicated to removing racial stereotypes, PepsiCo pledged a rebrand, a "$1 million commitment to empower and uplift Black girls and women," and a "five-year investment to uplift Black business and communities."

Another example of a commercial designed to combat racial stereotyping was the Proctor & Gamble "Widen the Screen" ad. This ad was part of a "larger effort by the company to confront racial stereotypes in media and give opportunities to Black creators." Proctor & Gamble created this campaign to emphasize statistics, including that "less than 6% of writers, directors, and producers of U.S.-produced films are Black," "only 8 of 1,447 directors identified as Black women" from 2007-2019, "black characters accounted for 15.7% of all film roles" in 2019, and "33% of the top 100 films in 2019 had no Black girls/women in any speaking or named roles." According to Proctor & Gamble, their brand hopes to fight systemic racism and support Black creators.

See also
Gender advertisement
Representation of African Americans in media
Chimamanda Ngozi Adichie

References

Racism
Social impact of advertising
Stereotypes